Paweł Michał Sarna (born 12 June 1984 in Nowy Sącz) is a Polish slalom canoeist who competed at the international level from 2000 to 2010, predominantly in the C2 category.

He won a bronze medal in the C2 team event at the 2003 ICF Canoe Slalom World Championships in Augsburg. He also won two silvers and two bronzes in the same event at the European Championships.

Competing in two Summer Olympics, he earned his best finish of eighth in the C2 event in Beijing in 2008.

He changed C2 partners several times during his career. He had most success competing alongside Marcin Pochwała (2001-2008), but he also raced alongside Grzegorz Wójs (2009) and Dawid Dobrowolski (2010).

References

1984 births
Canoeists at the 2004 Summer Olympics
Canoeists at the 2008 Summer Olympics
Living people
Olympic canoeists of Poland
Polish male canoeists
Sportspeople from Nowy Sącz
Medalists at the ICF Canoe Slalom World Championships